Carbon dioxide (CO2) flooding is a process whereby carbon dioxide is injected into oil reservoirs in order to increase output when extracting oil, especially in reservoirs where production rates have declined over time. The process was first attempted in 1977 in Scurry County, Texas. Since then, the process has become extensively used in the Permian basin region of the US and is now more recently begun to be pursued in many different states, but still remains fairly uncommon outside of the United States.

Overview 
When a reservoir's pressure is depleted through primary and secondary production, carbon dioxide flooding can be an ideal tertiary recovery method. It is most effective and most commonly used in sandstone and carbonate (such as limestone or dolomite) reservoirs and reservoirs that produce medium to light oil. By injecting CO2 into the reservoir, the viscosity of any hydrocarbon will be reduced, and hence will be easier to sweep into the production well. Sandstone and carbonate reservoirs are preferred for this method over reservoirs with ultra-low permeability such as shale due to the risk of CO2 gas breaking through hydraulic or natural fractures in the rock. CO2 flooding is still sometimes used in these instances, but usually using the "huff and puff" CO2 injection method, which allows the CO2 to soak in a reservoir after being pumped in through the injection well for a period of time before the production well is opened and put back into functionality. This method reduces the chances of unwanted gas breaks, and increased amount of oil recovered as opposed to the more common CO2 injection water alternating gas process (WAG). 

As an oil field matures and production rates decline, there is a growing incentive to intervene and attempt to increase oil output utilizing tertiary recovery techniques (also termed improved or enhanced oil recovery). The decline of efficacy of primary or secondary methods could be due to several factors, such as poor management, reduction of internal pressure due decreasing amounts of oil, or because of heterogeneity of the reservoir. Reservoir heterogeneity could be caused by fractures or faults in the rock, or barriers produced by highly cemented areas or shale. Most of the time, around 60 to 70% of oil cannot be procured conventionally, and secondary or tertiary recovery techniques must be used. It is also generally true that the transition from secondary recovery techniques to tertiary recovery techniques happens well before the reservoir becomes completely unproductive.

Petroleum engineers assess available options for increasing well productivity, options that include chemical injection, thermal/steam injection, and CO2 injection. Based on data-gathering and computer simulations, the best enhanced oil-recovery technique to maximize well-productivity is determined. However, in all cases of reservoirs that have declining productivity, to increase the rate of oil production, the pressure within the reservoir must be increased. The method employed, however varies on a case-by-case basis.

Method 

In CO2 flooding, the first step is an injection of water into the reservoir, which will allow the pressure in the reservoir to return to productive levels. Once the reservoir has sufficient pressure, the next step is to pump the CO2 down through the same injection well. The CO2 gas is forced into the reservoir to come into contact with the oil. This creates a miscible front of CO2 and low-boiling hydrocarbon derivatives. An oil bank forms in front of the miscible zone, and is more easily moved out of the reservoir via the production well. Additionally, as the gas dissolves into the oil, the viscosity of the oil with CO2 dissolved in it decreases. Normally the CO2 injection is alternated with water injection and the water acts to sweep the oil towards the production zone, this is called water alternating gas process (WAG).

Pros and Cons 

CO2 flooding is a method preferred for medium to light oils due to the "mobility ratio" between the gas and the oil. The mobility ratio refers to the ratio of the mobility of the gas or fluid injected into a reservoir for secondary or tertiary production versus the mobility of the oil. For medium or light oils with a high API gravity, fluids or gases that are less viscous themselves can be used. However, if an injection fluid or gas that had lower viscosity was used on a heavy crude oil or bitumen, the injection fluid or gas would bypass the oil and result in a poorly swept reservoir. While CO2 and water injection are more useful for lighter oils, co-solvents are still often added to make them more viscous so that they will have a more productive sweep of the reservoir. In cases where the reservoir is filled with extremely heavy oil or bitumen, steam injection, or other methods that employ heat, are much more commonly favored so that the mobility or viscosity of the oil can be lowered and the extraction will become easier. Generally, reservoirs with lighter oils will have higher recovery percentages with primary and secondary recovery methods, but reservoirs with heavier oils or bitumen will have much lower recovery with primary and secondary recovery methods and the transition from secondary to tertiary methods will have to occur much earlier in the reservoirs lifespan. 

CO2 flooding is the second most common tertiary recovery technique and is used in facilities around the world. In connection with greenhouse gas emissions and global warming, CO2 flooding is advertised to sequester CO2 underground and therefore offset CO2 emissions elsewhere. This and the fact that it can usually be applied in a wide range or geologic conditions makes it a very popular method to recover residual oil, however, there are several drawbacks to the method. For one, because the gas alone has very low viscosity, there is very little control over it and this causes the possibility of it breaking through the producer well or fractures in the rock, and this is why the WAG technique is used. Another drawback is that this method has high gas requirements, and while most reservoirs attempt to use natural, locally sourced CO2, sometimes this is not feasible and the CO2 must either be transported long distances using a pipeline, or made from artificial industrial sources such as natural gas processing. Of course, all methods of sourcing CO2 for CO2 flooding have the possibility for accidental release of CO2, resulting in increased greenhouse gas emissions.

See also 
 Petroleum Industry

References

External links
Mississippi Oil Journal Map  Oil Well Map of EOR  field in Brookhaven Mississippi
Enhanced Oil Recovery Institute Enhanced Oil Recovery Institute

Wikipedia Student Program
Oil wells
Greenhouse gases